The Verdun Dragons were a hockey team based in Verdun, Quebec.  The team was part of the Ligue Nord-Américaine de Hockey. The Dragons played at the Verdun Auditorium. They won the Futura Cup against the Saint-Georges Garaga in 2003–2004.

Initially the team was based in Haut-Richelieu, Quebec, taking the name Dragons. This lasted from the 1996–97 season. The next season, they moved to Iberville, Quebec. They only played one season in Iberville and moved again to Saint-Laurent, Quebec. They played in Saint-Laurent for three seasons before moving to Verdun in 2002.

Ice hockey teams in Montreal
Defunct Ligue Nord-Américaine de Hockey teams
Quebec Semi-Pro Hockey League teams
Verdun, Quebec